SP77 46-44 (WOH S341) is a red supergiant star found in the Large Magellanic Cloud in the constellation of Dorado.  It is one of the largest stars discovered, with a radius over 1,200 solar radii.  If placed in the Solar System, its photosphere would engulf the orbit of Jupiter.

The apparent magnitude of SP77 46-44 varies by about 0.8 magnitudes around 11.5.  No variable star classification has been assigned.

Notes

References

Large Magellanic Cloud
M-type supergiants
Extragalactic stars
Dorado (constellation)
J05294221-6857173